Maxwell William Rayson (26 August 1912 – 11 May 1993) was an Australian cricketer. He played three first-class cricket matches for Victoria during the 1937–38 season.

References

External links
 Army Service Record: Rayson, William Maxwell VX108126 (V40100)
 

1912 births
1993 deaths
Australian cricketers
Victoria cricketers
Cricketers from Melbourne
People from Kew, Victoria